Adler was the name of four ships of Argo Line, Germany
 , purchased from Norddeutscher Lloyd in 1887, sold in 1889.
 , in service 1900–38, sold to Italy
 , In service 1938–40, requisitioned by Kriegsmarine.
 , in service 1950–66, sold to the Philippines

Ship names